Busanjin District is a gu in central Busan, South Korea. It has an area of 29.7 km², and a population of about 410,000. The name is sometimes abbreviated locally as "Jin-gu". Busanjin-gu is home to a major shopping, entertainment, and business area called Seomyeon.

Administrative divisions

Busanjin-gu is divided into 11 legal dong, which altogether comprise 20 administrative dong, as follows:

Bujeon-dong (釜田洞) (2 administrative dong)
Beomjeon-dong (凡田洞) (part of the administrative Bujeon 1(il)-dong)
Yeonji-dong (蓮池洞)
Choeup-dong (草邑洞)
Yangjeong-dong (楊亭洞) (2 administrative dong)
Jeonpo-dong (田浦洞) (2 administrative dong)
Buam-dong (釜岩洞) (2 administrative dong)
Danggam-dong (堂甘洞) (3 administrative dong)
Gaya-dong (伽倻洞) (2 administrative dong)
Gaegeum-dong (開琴洞) (3 administrative dong)
Beomcheon-dong (凡川洞) (2 administrative dong)

Politics

The northern part of Busanjin is represented by Busanjin District First national assembly constituency and the southern part of Busanjin is represented by Busanjin District Second national assembly constituency

Economy
Air Busan has its headquarters in Busanjin-gu.
Daewoo Bus Corporation has the Busan Plant located.
Busan Citizens Park (formerly Camp Hialeah) is a former Imperial Japanese Army base and United States Army camp located in the district.

See also

Busanjin Station
Camp Hialeah
Geography of South Korea

Cityscape

References

External links 

 Busanjin-gu website 
 

 
Districts of Busan